The fourth season of The Voice of Albania aired from 18 October 2014 to 5 January 2015 on Top Channel. The show is still hosted by Ledion Liço. There were two new judges - Genc Salihu and Elsa Lila, Vodafone Albania sponsored the series and used the slogan "Unique: like your Voice!"

Blind auditions
(Albanian: Audicionet e fshehuras) Each coach has the length of the artists' performance to decide if they want that artist on their team. Should two or more coaches want the same artist, then the artist will choose their coach.

Episode 1 (4 October)
The series premiere was broadcast on 4 October 2014
Colour key

Episode 2 (6 October)
The second episode was broadcast on 6 October 2014

Episode 3 (11 October)
The third episode was broadcast on 11 October 2014

Episode 4 (13 October)
The fourth episode was broadcast on 13 October 2014

Episode 5 (18 October)
The fifth of the blind auditions was broadcast on 18 October 2014

Episode 6 (20 October)
The sixth and final episode of the blind auditions was broadcast on 18 October 2014

Battle rounds
The Battles or battle rounds (Albanian: Betejats) are where each coach is allowed two saves – they may hit their button as many times as they like but may only steal two artists. The first episode aired on 25 October, the second on 8 November, and the third on 15 November 2014

Colour key

Episode 1 (25 October)

Episode 2 (1 November)

Series 4
2014 Albanian television seasons
2015 Albanian television seasons